Esclauzels is a commune in the Lot department in the south-western France. As of 2019, its population is 221.

The commune of Esclauzels is part of the arrondissement of Cahors and the canton of Causse et Vallées.

See also
Communes of the Lot department

References

Communes of Lot (department)